Cazaclia is a commune and village in the Gagauz Autonomous Territorial Unit of the Republic of Moldova.  The 2004 census listed the commune as having a population of 7,043 people.   Gagauz total 6,796. Minorities included 56 Moldovans, 53 Russians, 36 Ukrainians, 68 Bulgarians and 34 'other nationality'.

Its geographical coordinates are 46° 0' 37" North, 28° 39' 46" East.

References

Cazaclia